Radiomafia was a Finnish radio station owned by Yle and mainly directed to teenagers and young adults. It was established on 1 June 1990 and decommissioned on 12 January 2003. It was followed by YleX, with some of the programmes moved to other channels, such as YleQ, Yle Radio Suomi and Yle Radio 1.

Radio stations in Finland
Radio stations established in 1990
2003 disestablishments in Finland
1990 establishments in Finland
Radio stations disestablished in 2003
Yle radio stations 
Defunct radio stations 
Defunct mass media in Finland